Osborn Airfield  is a private airport located 3 miles southwest of Groveland, Florida. 



History  

The airport was formerly known as Klinger Airport. Jon and Darlene Osborn, the current owners of the airfield, bought Klinger in 2004 and gave it its present name. According to the official website, the airport facilities are expanding, and will soon include 28 new hangars in addition to the four hangars and 18 tie-downs already present. Although the airfield is private, it is open to the public for fly-ins.

References

External links 
 Airport homepage

Airports in Florida
Transportation buildings and structures in Lake County, Florida